Baley may refer to:

People
Gillum Baley (1813–1895), American pioneer and judge
Héctor Baley (born 1950), Argentine footballer
Henry Baley (died 1701), governor of the Hudson's Bay Company
James M. Baley Jr. (1912–2003), American lawyer and judge
Stefan Baley (1885–1952), Polish psychologist
Virko Baley (born 1938), Ukrainian-American musician
Michael Alston Baley, stage name of David Brimmer (born 1957), American voice actor and fight choreographer
Baley (DJ), born Gabriel Ogrin, Slovenian DJ and music producer

Places
Baley, Bulgaria, a village in Vidin Province, Bulgaria
Baley, Russia, and Baley Urban Settlement, Zabaykalsky Krai, Russia
Baley Airport
Baley Nunatak, a hill in Antarctica

Other uses
Elijah Baley, a fictional character in the Robot series by Isaac Asimov

See also

Bayley (disambiguation)
Bailey (disambiguation)